The name Emong has been used for six tropical cyclones in the Philippines by PAGASA in the Western Pacific.
 Typhoon Chebi (2001) (T0102, 04W, Emong) – approached Taiwan and struck China.
 Tropical Depression Emong (2005) – a tropical depression that was only recognized by PAGASA.
 Typhoon Chan-hom (2009) (T0902, 02W, Emong)
 Tropical Storm Leepi (2013) (T1304, 04W, Emong) – approached Japan.
 Tropical Storm Nanmadol (2017) (T1703, 05W, Emong)
 Tropical Depression Emong (2021) (07W, Emong)

Pacific typhoon set index articles